Indian literature refers to the literature produced on the Indian subcontinent until 1947 and in the Republic of India thereafter. The Republic of India has 22 officially recognised languages.

The earliest works of Indian literature were orally transmitted. Sanskrit literature begins with the oral literature of the Rig Veda, a collection of literature dating to the period 1500–1200 BCE. The Sanskrit epics Ramayana and Mahabharata were subsequently codified and appeared towards the end of the 2nd millennium BCE. Classical Sanskrit literature developed rapidly during the first few centuries of the first millennium BCE, as did  the Pāli Canon and Tamil Sangam literature.
In the medieval period, literature in Kannada and Telugu appeared in the 9th and 10th centuries respectively. Later, literature in Marathi, Gujarati, Bengali, Assamese, Odia,  and Maithili appeared. Thereafter literature in various dialects of Hindi, Persian and Urdu began to appear as well. In 1913, Bengali poet Rabindranath Tagore became India's first Nobel laureate in literature. In contemporary Indian literature, there are two major literary awards; these are the Sahitya Akademi Fellowship and the Jnanpith Award. Eight Jnanpith Awards each have been awarded in Hindi and Kannada, followed by five in Bengali and Malayalam, four in Odia, Gujarati, Marathi, Telugu and Urdu, two each in Assamese and Tamil, and one each in Sanskrit and Kashmiri۔

In archaic Indian languages

Vedic literature

Examples of early works written in Vedic Sanskrit include, the core Vedas and Upanishads. Other examples include the Sulba Sutras, which are some of the earliest texts on geometry.

Epic Sanskrit literature

Ved Vyasa's Mahabharata and Valmiki's Ramayana, written in Epic Sanskrit, are regarded as the greatest Sanskrit epics.

Classical Sanskrit literature

The famous poet and playwright Kālidāsa wrote one epic: Raghuvamsha (Dynasty of Raghu); it was written in Classical Sanskrit rather than Epic Sanskrit. Other examples of works written in Classical Sanskrit include the Pāṇini's Ashtadhyayi, which standardised the grammar and phonetics of Classical Sanskrit. The Laws of Manu (मनुस्मृति) is a famous text in Hinduism. Kālidāsa is often considered to be the greatest playwright in Sanskrit literature and one of the greatest poets in Sanskrit literature; his Recognition of Shakuntala (अभिज्ञानशाकुन्तलम्) and Meghaduuta are Kalidasa's most famous play and poem respectively. Other famous plays include Mricchakatika by Shudraka, Svapna Vasavadattam by Bhasa, and Ratnavali by Sri Harsha. Later poetic works include Gita Govinda by Jayadeva. Some other famous works are Chanakya's Arthashastra and Vatsyayana's Kamasutra.

Prakrit literature
The most notable Prakrit languages were the Jain Prakrit (Ardhamagadhi), Pali, Gāndhārī, Maharashtri and Shauraseni.

One of the earliest extant Prakrit works is Hāla's anthology of poems in Maharashtri, the Gāhā Sattasaī, dating to the 3rd to 5th century CE. Kālidāsa and Harsha also used Maharashtri in some of their plays and poetry. In Jainism, many Svetambara works were written in Maharashtri.

Many of Aśvaghoṣa's plays were written in Shauraseni as were a sizable number of Jain works and Rajasekhara's Karpuramanjari. Canto 13 of the Bhaṭṭikāvya is written in what is called "like the vernacular" (bhāṣāsama), that is, it can be read in two languages simultaneously: Prakrit and Sanskrit.

The surviving Gāndhāran Buddhist texts are written in the Gāndhārī language, a northwestern prakrit spoken in Gandhāra.

Pali literature

The Theravada Buddhist Tipitaka (Triple Basket) in the Pali language is mostly of Indian origin. Later Pali literature however was mostly produced outside of the mainland Indian subcontinent, particularly in Sri Lanka and Southeast Asia.

The canonical Pali literature includes Buddhist discourses (suttas), Abhidharma works, poetry, works on monastic discipline (vinaya), and the Jataka tales. There are also later post-canonical works written in India, such as the Milindapanha, a dialogue between a Buddhist monk and an Indo-Greek King.

Tamil Sangam literature

The Sangam literature (Tamil: சங்க இலக்கியம், Sanga ilakkiyam) is the ancient Tamil literature of the period in the history of south India (known as the Thamizhagam or the Tamilagam) spanning from c. 300 BCE to 300 CE (Akananuru (1, 15, 31, 55, 61, 65, 91, 97, 101, 115, 127, 187, 197, 201, 211, 233, 251, 265, 281, 311, 325, 331, 347, 349, 359, 393, 281, 295), Kurunthogai (11), Natrinai (14, 75) are dated before 300 BCE). This collection contains 2381 poems in Tamil composed by 473 poets, some 102 of whom remain anonymous.

Most of the available Sangam literature is from the Third Sangam, this period is known as the Sangam period, which refers to the prevalent Sangam legends claiming literary academies lasting thousands of years, giving the name to the corpus of literature. The Only religious poems among the shorter poems occur in paripaatal. The rest of the corpus of Sangam literature deals with human relationship and emotions.

Sangam literature deals with emotional and material topics such as love, war, governance, trade and bereavement. Some of the greatest Tamil scholars, like Thiruvalluvar, who wrote on ethics, and on the various issues of life like virtue, wealth and love, or the Tamil poet Mamulanar, who explored historical incidents that happened in India, lived during the Sangam period.

In common Indian languages

Assamese literature

The Buddhist Charyapadas are often cited as the earliest example of Assamese literature. The Charyapadas are Vajrayana Buddhist songs composed in the 8th to 12th centuries. These writings bear similarities to Oriya and Bengali languages as well. The phonological and morphological traits of these songs, some of which are extant, bear very strong resemblance to Assamese.

After the Charyapadas, the period may again be split into (a) Pre-Vaishnavite and (b) Vaishnavite sub-periods. The earliest known Assamese writer is Hema Saraswati, who wrote a small poem "Prahlada Charita". In the time of the King Indranarayana (1350–1365) of Kamatapur the two poets Harihara Vipra and Kaviratna Saraswati composed Asvamedha Parva and Jayadratha Vadha respectively. Another poet named Rudra Kandali translated Drona Parva into Assamese. But the most well-known poet of the Pre-Vaishnavite sub period is Madhav Kandali, who rendered Valmiki's Ramayana into Assamese verse (Kotha Ramayana, 11th century) under the patronage of Mahamanikya, a Kachari king of Jayantapura.

Assamese writers of Vaishnavite periods had been Srimanta Sankardev, Madhabdev, Damodardev, Haridevand Bhattadev. Among these, Srimanta Sankardev has been widely acknowledged as the top Assamese littérateur of all-time, and generally acknowledged as the one who introduced drama, poetry, classical dance form called Satriya, classical music form called Borgeet, art and painting, stage enactment of drama called Bhaona and Satra tradition of monastic lifestyle. His main disciples Madhabdev and Damodardev followed in his footsteps, and enriched Assamese literary world with their own contributions. Damodardev's disciple Bhattadev is acknowledged as the first Indian prose writer, who introduced the unique prose writing style in Assamese.

Of the post-Vaishnavite age of Assamese literature, notable modern Assamese writers are Lakshminath Bezbaruah, Padmanath Gohain Baruah, Hemchandra Goswami, Hem Chandra Barua, Atul Chandra Hazarika, Nalini Bala Devi, Birendra Kumar Bhattacharya, Amulya Barua, Navakanta Barua, Syed Abdul Malik, Bhabananda Deka, Jogesh Das, Homen Borgohain, Bhabendra Nath Saikia, Lakshmi Nandan Bora, Nirmal Prabha Bordoloi, Mahim Bora, Hiren Gohain, Arun Sharma, Hiren Bhattacharyya, Mamoni Raisom Goswami, Nalini Prava Deka, Nilamani Phukan, Arupa Kalita Patangia, Dhrubajyoti Bora, Arnab Jan Deka, Rita Chowdhury, Anuradha Sharma Pujari, Manikuntala Bhattacharya, Sananta Tanty, Nabakanta Barua, Samir Tanty, and several others.

A comprehensive introductory book Assamese Language-Literature & Sahityarathi Lakshminath Bezbaroa originally authored by leading Assamese littérateur of Awahon-Ramdhenu Era and pioneer Assam economist Bhabananda Deka together with his three deputies, Parikshit Hazarika, Upendra Nath Goswami and Prabhat Chandra Sarma, was published in 1968. This book was officially released in New Delhi on 24 Nov 1968 by then President of India Dr Zakir Hussain in commemoration of the birth centenary celebration of doyen of Assamese literature Lakshminath Bezbaroa. After almost half a century, this historic book has been recovered and re-edited by Assamese award-winning short-story writer & novelist Arnab Jan Deka, which was published by Assam Foundation-India in 2014. This second enlarged edition was officially released on 4 December 2014 on the occasion of 150th birth anniversary of Lakshminath Bezbaroa and 8th Death Anniversary of Bhabananda Deka by Great Britain-based bilingual magazine Luit to Thames (Luitor Pora Thamsoloi) editor Dr Karuna Sagar Das.

Bengali literature

The first evidence of Bengali literature is known as Charyapada or Charyageeti, which were Buddhist hymns from the 8th century. Charyapada is in the oldest known written form of Bengali. The famous Bengali linguist Hara Prasad Shastri discovered the palm leaf Charyapada manuscript in the Nepal Royal Court Library in 1907.
The most internationally famous Bengali writer is Nobel laureate Rabindranath Tagore, who received the Nobel Prize for Literature in 1913 for his work "Gitanjali". He wrote the national anthem of India and Bangladesh namely, "Jana Gana Mana" and "Amar Sonar Bangla", respectively. He was the first Asian who won the Nobel Prize.
Rabindranath has written an enormous number of poems, songs, essays, novels, plays and short stories. His songs remain popular and are still widely sung in Bengal.

Kazi Nazrul Islam, who is one generation younger than Tagore, is also equally popular, valuable, and influential in socio-cultural context of the Bengal, though virtually unknown in foreign countries. And among later generation poets, Jibanananda Das is considered the most important figure.
Other famous Indian Bengali writers were Sharat Chandra Chattopadhyay, Bankim Chandra Chattopadhyay, Michael Madhusudan Dutt, Jasimuddin, Bibhutibhushan Bandyopadhyay etc.

Sukanta Bhattacharya (15 August 1926 – 13 May 1947) was a Bengali poet and playwright. Along with Rabindranath Tagore and Kazi Nazrul Islam, he was one of the key figures of modern Bengali poetry, despite the fact that most of his works had been in publication posthumously. During his life, his poems were not widely circulated, but after his death his reputation grew to the extent that he became one of the most popular Bengali poet of the 20th century.

Bengali is the second most commonly spoken language in India (after Hindi).
As a result of the Bengal Renaissance in the 19th and 20th centuries, many of India's most famous, and
relatively recent, literature, poetry, and songs are in Bengali.

In the history of Bengali literature there has been only one pathbreaking literary movement by a group of poets and artists who called themselves Hungryalists.

Bhojpuri literature

Chhattisgarhi literature
Literature in Chhattisgarh reflects the regional consciousness and the evolution of an identity distinct from others in Central India. The social problems of the lower castes/untouchables were highlighted in the writings of Khub Chand Baghel through his plays Jarnail Singh and Unch Neech.

English literature

In the 20th century, several Indian writers have distinguished themselves not only in traditional Indian languages but also in English, a language inherited from the British. As a result of British colonisation, India has developed its own unique dialect of English known as Indian English. Indian English typically follows British spelling and pronunciation as opposed to American, and books published in India reflect this phenomenon. Indian English literature, however, tends to utilise more internationally recognisable vocabulary then does colloquial Indian English, in the same way that American English literature does so as compared to American slang.

India's only Nobel laureate in literature was the Bengali writer Rabindranath Tagore, who wrote some of his work originally in English, and did some of his own English translations from Bengali. India's best selling English-language novelists of all-time are the contemporary writers like Chetan Bhagat, Manjiri Prabhu and Ashok Banker. More recent major writers in English who are either Indian or of Indian origin and derive much inspiration from Indian themes are R. K. Narayan, Vikram Seth, Salman Rushdie, Arundhati Roy, Raja Rao, Amitav Ghosh, Rohinton Mistry, Vikram Chandra, Mukul Kesavan, Raj Kamal Jha, Vikas Swarup, Khushwant Singh, Shashi Tharoor, Nayantara Sehgal, Anita Desai, Kiran Desai, Ashok Banker, Shashi Deshpande, Arnab Jan Deka, Jhumpa Lahiri, Kamala Markandaya, Gita Mehta, Manil Suri, Manjiri Prabhu, Ruskin Bond, Chitra Banerjee Divakaruni and Bharati Mukherjee.

In category of Indian writing in English is poetry. Rabindranath Tagore wrote in Bengali and English and was responsible for the translations of his own work into English. Other early notable poets in English include Derozio, Michael Madhusudan Dutt, Toru Dutt, Romesh Chunder Dutt, Sri Aurobindo, Sarojini Naidu, and her brother Harindranath Chattopadhyay.

In the 1950s, the Writers Workshop collective in Calcutta was founded by the poet and essayist P. Lal to advocate and publish Indian writing in English. The press was the first to publish Pritish Nandy, Sasthi Brata, and others; it continues to this day to provide a forum for English writing in India. In modern times, Indian poetry in English was typified by two very different poets. Dom Moraes, winner of the Hawthornden Prize at the age of 19 for his first book of poems A Beginning went on to occupy a pre-eminent position among Indian poets writing in English. Nissim Ezekiel, who came from India's tiny Bene Israel Jewish community, created a voice and place for Indian poets writing in English and championed their work.

Their contemporaries in English poetry in India were Jayanta Mahapatra, Gieve Patel, A. K. Ramanujan, Arun Kolatkar, Dilip Chitre, Arvind Krishna Mehrotra, Eunice De Souza, Kersi Katrak, P. Lal and Kamala Das among several others.

Younger generations of poets writing in English include G. S. Sharat Chandra, Hoshang Merchant, Makarand Paranjape, Anuradha Bhattacharyya, Arundhathi Subramaniam, Jeet Thayil, Ranjit Hoskote, Sudeep Sen, Abhay K, Jerry Pinto, K Srilata, Gopi Kottoor, Tapan Kumar Pradhan, Arnab Jan Deka, Anju Makhija, Robin Ngangom, Rukmini Bhaya Nair, Smita Agarwal and Vihang A. Naik among others.

A generation of exiles also sprang from the Indian diaspora. Among these are names like Agha Shahid Ali, Sujata Bhatt, Richard Crasta, Yuyutsu Sharma, Shampa Sinha, Tabish Khair and Vikram Seth.

In recent years, English-language writers of Indian origin are being published in the West at an increasing rate.

Salman Rushdie, Arundhati Roy, Kiran Desai and Arvind Adiga have won the prestigious Booker Prize, with Salman Rushdie going on to win the Booker of Bookers.

Hindi literature

Hindi literature started as religious and philosophical poetry in medieval periods in dialects like Avadhi and Brij. The most famous figures from this period are Kabir and Tulsidas. In modern times, the Dehlavi dialect of the Hindi Belt became more prominent than Sanskrit.

Chandrakanta, written by Devaki Nandan Khatri, is considered to be the first work of prose in Hindi. Munshi Premchand was the most famous Hindi novelist. The chhayavadi poets include Suryakant Tripathi 'Nirala', Prem Bajpai, Jaishankar Prasad, Sumitranandan Pant, and Mahadevi Varma. Other renowned poets include Ramdhari Singh 'Dinkar', Maithili Sharan Gupt, Agyeya, Harivansh Rai Bachchan, and Dharmveer Bharti.

Gujarati literature

Gujarati literature's history may be traced to 1000 AD. Since then literature has flourished till date. Well known laureates of Gujarati literature are Hemchandracharya, Narsinh Mehta, Mirabai, Akho, Premanand Bhatt, Shamal Bhatt, Dayaram, Dalpatram, Narmad, Govardhanram Tripathi, Gandhi, K. M. Munshi, Umashankar Joshi, Suresh Joshi, Pannalal Patel and Rajendra Keshavlal Shah.

Gujarat Vidhya Sabha, Gujarat Sahitya Sabha, and Gujarati Sahitya Parishad are Ahmedabad based literary institutions promoting the spread of Gujarati literature.
Umashankar Joshi, Pannalal Patel, Rajendra Keshavlal Shah and Raghuveer Chaudhary have won the Jnanpith Award, the highest literary award in India.

Kannada literature

The oldest existing record of Kannada prose is the Halmidi inscription of 450 CE, and poetry in tripadi metre is the Kappe Arabhatta record of 700 CE. The folk form of literature began earlier than any other literature in Kannada. Gajashtaka (800 CE) by King Shivamara II, Chudamani (650 CE) by Thumbalacharya are examples of early literature now considered extinct. Kavirajamarga by King Nripatunga Amoghavarsha I (850 CE) is the earliest existing literary work in Kannada. It is a writing on literary criticism and poetics meant to standardise various written Kannada dialects used in literature in previous centuries. The book makes reference to Kannada works by early writers such as King Durvinita of the 6th century and Ravikirti, the author of the Aihole record of 636 CE. An early extant prose work, the Vaddaradhane by Shivakotiacharya of 900 CE provides an elaborate description of the life of Bhadrabahu of Shravanabelagola. Since the earliest available Kannada work is one on grammar and a guide of sorts to unify existing variants of Kannada grammar and literary styles, it can be safely assumed that literature in Kannada must have started several centuries earlier.
Pampa who popularised Champu style which is unique to Kannada wrote the epic "Vikramarjuna Vijaya". He also wrote "Adipurana". Other famous poets like Ponna wrote "shantinatapurana", "Bhuvanaikaramabhyudaya", "Jinaksharamale", and "gatapratyagata". Ranna wrote "Shantipurana" and "Ghadayudha". The Jain poet Nagavarma II wrote "Kavyavalokana", "Karnatabhashabhushana" and "Vardhamanapurana" . Janna was the author of "Yashodhara Charitha". Rudhrabhatta and Durgashima wrote "Jagannatha Vijaya" and "Panchatantra" respectively. The works of the medieval period are based on Jain and Hindu principles. The Vachana Sahitya tradition of the 12th century is purely native and unique in world literature. It is the sum of contributions by all sections of society. Vachanas were pithy comments on that period's social, religious and economic conditions. More importantly, they held a mirror to the seed of social revolution, which caused a radical re-examination of the ideas of caste, creed and religion. Some of the important writers of Vachana literature include Basavanna, Allama Prabhu and Akka Mahadevi. Kumara Vyasa, who wrote the Karnata Bharata Katamanjari, has arguably been the most famous and most influential Kannada writer of the 15th century. The Bhakti movement gave rise to Dasa Sahitya around the 15th century which significantly contributed to the evolution of Carnatic music in its present form. This period witnessed great Haridasas like Purandara Dasa who has been aptly called the Pioneer of Carnatic music, Kanaka Dasa, Vyasathirtha and Vijaya Dasa. Modern Kannada in the 20th century has been influenced by many movements, notably Navodaya, Navya, Navyottara, Dalita and Bandaya. Contemporary Kannada literature has been highly successful in reaching people of all classes in society. Works of Kannada literature have received Eight Jnanpith awards, which is the highest number awarded for the literature in any Indian language. It has also received forty-seven Sahitya Academy awards.

Kashmiri literature

Kodava literature
When Kodava was written, it was usually with Kannada script, sometimes with minor modifications. ... The language had no significant written literature until the twentieth century. Appachcha Kavi, a playwright, and Nadikerianda Chinnappa, a folk compiler, are the two important poets and writers of the Kodava language.

Konkani literature
Konkani is a language with a complex and much-contested history. It is one of the few Indian languages to be written in five scripts—Roman, Nagari, Kannada, Persian-Arabic and Malayalam-and also has an extensive oral literature. The first modern Konkani novel, 'Kristanv ghorabo', was written by Eduardo Jose Bruno De Souza, while 'Mhaji ba khãya geli?' by Shenoy Goembab is the first modern short story in Konkani literature. Other prominent Konkani writers include Ravindra Kelekar, Bakibab Borkar, Chandrakant Keni, Damodar Mauzo, Arvind Mhambro, C. F. D'Costa, Pundalik Naik, Hema Naik, Bonaventure D'Pietro, Dilip Borkar, Mahabaleshwar Sail, V. J. P. Saldana, Meena kakodkar, Jess Fernandes, K. M. Sukhthankar, Nayana Adarkar.

Malayalam literature

Even up to 500 years since the start of the Malayalam calendar which commenced in 825 AD, Malayalam literature remained in preliminary stage. During this time, Malayalam literature consisted mainly of various genres of songs. Ramacharitham written by Cheeramakavi is a collection of poems written at the end of preliminary stage in Malayalam literature's evolution, and is the oldest Malayalam book available. Thunchaththu Ramanujan Ezhuthachan (17th century) is considered as the Father of the Malayalam language, because of his influence on the acceptance of the Malayalam alphabet and his extremely popular poetic works like Adhyathmaramayanam. Several noted works were written during the 19th century, but it was in the 20th century the Malayalam literary movement came to prominence. Malayalam literature flourished under various genres and today it is a fully developed part of Indian literature.

Maithili literature

Maithili literature is the entire collection of poetry, novels, short stories, documents and other writings in the Maithili language. The most famous literary figure in Maithili is the poet Vidyapati (1350–1450), who wrote his poems in the language of the people, i.e., Maithili, at a time when state's official language was Sanskrit and Sanskrit was being used as a literary language. The use of Maithili, instead of Sanskrit, in literature became more common after Vidyapati.
Jyotirishwar mentions Lorika. Vachaspati II in his Tattvachintamani and Vidyapati in his Danavakyavali have profusely used typical Maithili words of daily use.

The Maithili script, Mithilakshara or Tirhuta as it is popularly known, is of a great antiquity. The Lalitavistara mentions the Vaidehi script. Early in the latter half of the 7th century A.D., a marked change occurred in the northeastern alphabet, and the inscriptions of Adityasena exhibit this change for the first time. The eastern variety develops and becomes the Maithili script, which comes into use in Assam, Bengal, and Nepal. The earliest recorded epigraphic evidence of the script is found in the Mandar Hill Stone inscriptions of Adityasena in the 7th century A.D., now fixed in the Baidyanath temple of Deoghar.

The language of the Buddhist dohas is described as belonging to the mixed Maithili—Kamrupi language.

Meitei literature

Meitei literature is literature written in the Meitei language (Manipuri, Meiteilon), including literature composed in Meitei by writers from Manipur, Assam, Tripura, Myanmar and Bangladesh. The history of Meitei literature can be traced back to thousands of years with the flourish of Meitei civilization. Despite massive devastation and the burning of Meitei scriptures, such as the Puya Meithaba, Meitei literature survived. The resilience that Meiteis would demonstrate in the event of devastation proves their ability to survive throughout history. Most of the early literary works found in Meitei literature were in poetry and prose or a combination of both. One of the most famous Meitei writers of the twentieth century is M. K. Binodini Devi.

Marathi literature

Marathi literature began with saint-poets like Dnyaneshwar, Tukaram, Ramdas, and Eknath. Modern Marathi literature was marked by a theme of social reform. Well-known figures from this phase include Mahatma Jyotiba Phule, Lokhitwadi, and others. Prominent modern literary figures include Jnanpith Award winners Vishnu Sakharam Khandekar, Vishnu Vaman Shirvadakar (Kavi Kusumagraj) and Govind Vinayak Karandikar. Though the earliest known Marathi inscription found at the foot of the statue at Shravanabelgola in Karnataka is dated c. 983 CE, the Marathi literature actually started with the religious writings by the saint-poets belonging to Mahanubhava and Warkari sects. Mahanubhava saints used prose as their main medium, while Warkari saints preferred poetry as the medium. The early saint-poets were Mukundaraj who wrote Vivekasindhu, Dnyaneshwar (1275–1296) (who wrote Amrutanubhav and Bhawarthadeepika, which is popularly known as Dnyaneshwari, a 9000-couplets long commentary on the Bhagavad Gita) and Namdev. They were followed by the Warkari saint-poet Eknath (1528–1599). Mukteswar translated the great epic Mahabharata into Marathi. Social reformers like saint-poet Tukaram transformed Marathi into an enriched literary language. Ramdas's (1608–1681) Dasbodh and Manache Shlok are well-known products of this tradition.

In the 18th century, some well-known works like Yatharthadeepika (by Vaman Pandit), Naladamayanti Swayamvara (by Raghunath Pandit), Pandava Pratap, Harivijay, Ramvijay (by Shridhar Pandit) and Mahabharata (by Moropant) were produced. However, the most versatile and voluminous writer among the poets was Moropanta (1729–1794) whose Mahabharata was the first epic poem in Marathi. The historical section of the old Marathi literature was unique as it contained both prose and poetry. The prose section contained the Bakhars that were written after the foundation of the Maratha kingdom by Chhatrapati Shivaji Maharaj. The poetry section contained the Povadas and the Katavas composed by the Shahirs. The period from 1794 to 1818 is regarded as the closing period of the Old Marathi literature and the beginning of the Modern Marathi literature.

Modern period (after 1800)
The period of the late 19th century in Maharashtra is the period of colonial modernity. Like the corresponding periods in the other Indian languages, this was the period dominated by the English educated intellectuals. It was the age of prose and reason. It was the period of reformist didacticism and a great intellectual ferment.

The first English book was translated in Marathi in 1817. The first Marathi newspaper started in 1835. Many books on social reforms were written by Baba Padamji (Yamuna Paryatana, 1857), Mahatma Jyotiba Phule, Lokhitwadi, Justice Mahadev Govind Ranade, Hari Narayan Apte (1864–1919) etc. Lokmanya Tilak's newspaper Kesari, set up in 1880, provided a platform for sharing literary views. V.D. Savarkar's '1857 Che Swatantryasamar' (The Indian War of Independence 1857) served as a Bible for Revolutionaries throughout India. Marathi at this time was efficiently aided by Marathi Drama. Here, there also was a different genre called 'Sangit Natya' or musicals. The first play was V.A. Bhave's Sita Swayamvar in 1843. Later Kirioskar (1843–85) and G.B. Deval (1854-19l6) brought a romantic aroma and social content. But Krishnaji Prabhakar Khadilkar (1872~1948) with his banned play Kichaka-Vadh (1910) set the trend of political playwriting. Later on this "stage" was ably served by stalwarts like Ram Ganesh Gadkari and Prahlad Keshav Atre. The drama flourished in the 1960s and 70s with few of the best Indian actors available to take on a variety of protagonists. Mohan Agashe, Sriram Lagoo, Kashinath Ghanekar, Prabhakar Panshikar playing many immortal characters penned by greats like Vasant Kanetkar, Kusumagraj, vijay Tendulkar to name a few. This drama movement was ably supported by Marathi films which did not enjoy a continuous success. Starting with V.Shantaram and before him the pioneer DadaSaheb Phalke, Marathi cinema went on to influence contemporary Hindi cinema. Director Raja Paranjape, Music director Sudhir Phadke, lyricist G.D. Madgulkar and actor Raja Gosavi came together to give quite a few hits in later period. Marathi language as spoken by people here was throughout influenced by drama and cinema along with contemporary literature. Modern Marathi poetry began with Mahatma Jyotiba Phule's compositions. The later poets like Keshavsuta, Balakavi, Govindagraj, and the poets of Ravi Kiran Mandal like Madhav Julian wrote poetry which was influenced by the Romantic and Victorian English poetry. It was largely sentimental and lyrical. Prahlad Keshav Atre, the renowned satirist and a politician wrote a parody of this sort of poetry in his collection Jhenduchi Phule. Sane Guruji (1899–1950) contributed to the children's literature in Marathi. His major works are Shyamchi Aai (Shyam's Mother), Astik (Believer), Gode Shevat (The Sweet Ending) etc. He translated and simplified many Western classics and published them in a book of stories titled Gode Goshti (Sweet Stories).

Mizo literature

Mizo literature is the literature written in Mizo ṭtawng, the principal language of the Mizo peoples, which has both written and oral traditions. It has undergone a considerable change in the 20th century. The language developed mainly from the Lushai language, with significant influence from Pawi language, Paite language and Hmar language, especially at the literary level. All Mizo languages such as Pawi language, Paite language etc. remained unwritten until the beginning of the 20th century. However, there was unwritten secular literature in the form of folktales, war chants etc. passed down from one generation to another. And there was rich religious literature in the form of sacerdotal chants. These are the chants used by the two types of priests, namely Bawlpu and Sadâwt. This article is about the written literature.

Nagpuri literature

Nagpuri literature refers to literature in the Nagpuri language, the language of Jharkhand, Chhattisgarh and Odisha. The earliest literature started in the nagpuri language when the Nagvanshi king and king of Ramgarh Raj started writing poetry in the 17th century. Since then, various literature has been written. Although in the present century, Nagpuri was never considered worthy of literary development, a small but dedicated writers have engaged in writing short stories, plays and poetry.

Nepali literature

Odia literature

Odia language literary history started with the charyapadas written in the 8th century AD. Odia has a rich literary heritage, the medieval period dating back to the 13th century. Sarala Das who lived in the 14th century is known as the Vyasa of Odisha. He translated the Mahabharata into Odia. In fact the language was initially standardised through a process of translation of classical Sanskrit texts like the Mahabharata, the Ramayana and the Srimad Bhagavatam. Jagannatha Das translated the Srimad Bhagavatam into Odia and his translation standardised the written form of the language. Odia has had a strong tradition of poetry, especially that of devotional poetry. Some other eminent ancient Odia Poets include Kabi Samrat Upendra Bhanja and Kavisurya Baladev Rath.

Odia language is replete in classicism. Various forms of poetry like champu, chhanda, bhajan, janan, poi, chautisha etc. were written during the medieval ages.

In the 19th century, Swabhab Kavi Gangadhar Meher (1862-1924), Fakir Mohan Senapati (1843–1918), Gouri Shankar Ray, Gopal Chandra Praharaj, Pandit Nilmani Vidyaratna, Kabibar Radhanath Ray were few of the prominent figures in prose and poetry writings of Odia literature. In the 20th century Godabarish Mohapatra, Kalindi Charana Panigrahi, Kanhu Charan Mohanty (1906–1994), Godabarish Mishra, Gopinath Mohanty (1914–1991), Sachidananda Routray (1916–2004), Sitakant Mahapatra (born 17 September 1937), Surendra Mohanty, Manoj Das, Kishori Charan Das, Ramakanta Rath (born 13 December 1934), Binapani Mohanty, Jagadish Mohanty, Sarojini Sahoo, Rajendra Kishore Panda, Padmaj Pal, Ramchandra Behera, Pratibha Satpathy, Nandini Sahu, Debaraj Samantray are few names who created Odia literature. Recently the Government of India accorded classical status to Odia in 2014. 
There was a time when Bengali tried to overpower Odia Language. Along with West Bengal, Chhattisgarh, Madhya Pradesh and Andhra Pradesh tookaway many parts of Odisha letting Odisha into nothingness and despair. Mostly the Bengalis claimed that Odia is the derived form of Bengali and so the language cannot independently exist.The famous Bengali Pandits like Kantilal Bhattacharya and Rajendra Mitra claimed that "Odia ekta swotontro bhasa hobena", i.e., Odia cannot withstand as an independent language. But they were unaware of the fact that Odia language is older than Bengali and even one of the oldest languages in the World. It is one of the classical languages. Owing to the immense contributions and sacrifices of pioneers like Fakirmohan Senapati, Gopabandhu Das, Madhusudan Das, Nilakantha Das, Gourishankar Ray, Maharaja Krushna Chandra Gajapati and many more, Odisha and Odia language got back its special identity and has stood tall among the best in the country.
The current state Odisha and the language Odia have evolved through many contributions and sacrifices.

Punjabi literature

The history of Punjabi literature starts with advent of Aryans in Punjab.
Punjab provided them the perfect environment in which to compose the ancient texts. The Rig-Veda is first example in which references are made to the rivers, flora and fauna of Punjab. The Punjabi literary tradition is generally conceived to commence with Fariduddin Ganjshakar (1173–1266).[2]. Farid's mostly spiritual and devotional verse were compiled after his death in the Adi Granth.

The Janamsakhis, stories on the life and legend of Guru Nanak (1469–1539), are early examples of Punjabi prose literature. Nanak himself composed Punjabi verse incorporating vocabulary from Sanskrit, Arabic, Persian, and other Indic languages as characteristic of the Gurbani tradition. Sufi poetry developed under Shah Hussain (1538–1599), Sultan Bahu (1628–1691), Shah Sharaf (1640–1724), Ali Haider (1690–1785), and Bulleh Shah (1680–1757). In contrast to Persian poets who had preferred the ghazal for poetic expression, Punjabi Sufi poets tended to compose in the Kafi.[3].

Punjabi Sufi poetry also influenced other Punjabi literary traditions particularly the Punjabi Qissa, a genre of romantic tragedy which also derived inspiration from Indic, Persian and Qur'anic sources. The Qissa of Heer Ranjha by Waris Shah (1706–1798) is among the most popular of Punjabi qisse. Other popular stories include Sohni Mahiwal by Fazal Shah, Mirza Sahiba by Hafiz Barkhudar (1658–1707), Sassi Punnun by Hashim Shah (1735?-1843?), and Qissa Puran Bhagat by Qadaryar (1802–1892).

The Victorian novel, Elizabethan drama, free verse and Modernism entered Punjabi literature through the introduction of British education during colonial rule. The setting up of a Christian mission at Ludhiana in 1835 (where a printing press was installed for using Gurmukhi fonts, and which also issued the first Punjabi grammar in 1838), the publication of a Punjabi dictionary by Reverend J. Newton in 1854 and the ripple-down effect of the strengthening and modernizing the education system under the patronage of the Singh Sabha Movement in the 1860s, were some of the developments that made it possible for 'modernism' to emerge in Punjabi literary culture. It needs to be pointed out here that 'modernism' is being used here as an umbrella term to cover a whole range of developments in the Punjabi literary culture, starting with the break from tradition or the past to a commitment to progressive ideology, from the experimental nature of the avant-garde to the newness of the forward-looking.

Rajasthani literature

Sindhi literature

Tamil literature

Tamil literature has a rich and long literary tradition spanning more than 2500 years (Sangam period: 5th century BC-3rd century CE.) Tolkaappiyam (3rd century BC) has been credited as the oldest work in Tamil available today. The history of Tamil literature follows the history of Tamil Nadu, closely following the social and political trends of various periods. The secular nature of the early Sangam poetry gave way to works of religious and didactic nature during the Middle Ages. Tirukkural is a fine example of such work on human behaviour and political morals. A wave of religious revival helped generate a great volume of literary output by Saivite and Vaishnavite authors. Jain and Buddhist authors during the medieval period and Muslim and European authors later also contributed to the growth of Tamil literature.

A revival of Tamil literature took place from the late 19th century when works of religious and philosophical nature were written in a style that made it easier for the common people to enjoy. Nationalist poets began to utilise the power of poetry in influencing the masses. Short stories and novels began to appear. The popularity of Tamil Cinema has also provided opportunities for modern Tamil poets to emerge.

Telugu literature

Telugu, the Indian language with the third largest number of speakers (after Hindi & Bengali), is rich in literary traditions.
The earliest written literature dates back to the 7th century. The epic literary tradition started with Nannayya who is acclaimed as Telugu's Aadikavi meaning the first poet. He belongs to the 10th or 11th century.

Vemana was a prince, also called Pedakomati or Vemaa Reddy, who lived in the 14th century and wrote poems in the language of the common man. He questioned the prevailing values and conventions and religious practices in his poems. His philosophy made him a unique poet of the masses.

Viswanadha Satyanarayana (Veyipadagalu) (1895–1976), a doyen of conventional yet creative literature, was the first to receive the Jnanpith Award for Telugu followed by C. Narayana Reddy and Ravuri Bharadwaja.

Srirangam Srinivasarao or Sri Sri (1910–1983) was a popular 20th century poet and lyricist. Srisri took the "Telugu literary band wagon that travelled in roads of kings and queens into that of muddy roads of common man".

Literary movements

Old Era
Telugu literature has been enriched by many literary movements, like the Veera Shaiva movement which gave birth to dwipada kavitvam (couplets). The Bhakti movement gave rise to compilations by Annamayya, Kshetrayya and Tyagaraja and kancharla Gopanna (Ramadasu). The renaissance movement heralded by Vemana stands for the old Telugu literary movements.

New Era
The Romantic Movement (led by Krishnasashtri, Rayaprolu, Vedula), Progressive Writers Movement, Digambara Kavitvam (Nagnamuni, Cherabanda Raju, Jwalamukhi, Nikhileswar, Bhairavayya and Mahaswapna Revolutionary Writers' Movement, Streevada Kavitvam and Dalita Kavitvam all flourished in Telugu literature. Telugu literature has been the standard bearer of Indian literature in these respects.

Fiction and prose literature:

Kandukuri Veeresalingam is said to be the father of Modern Telugu fiction. Kodavatiganti Kutumba Rao laid the foundation for the realistic modern Telugu novel and short story, and Rachakonda and Kalipatnam carried the flag in to excellency.

Annamaya, Gurajada Appa Rao, Kandukuri, Devulapalli, Jashuva, Unnava Laxminarayana (Malapalli), Bucchi Babu, Tripuraneni Gopichand, Maa Gokhale, Papineni Sivasankar and many more had a profound impact on Telugu literature.

Tripuri literature

Tripuri(Kokborok/Tiprakok) is the native language of Tripuri people in present Tripura state in North East of India. During 20th centuries many of Royal family and its officials contributes to develop the Kokborok Language in many ways.

A significant hint for the antiquity of the Kokborok language can be found in the lines in the "Rajmala", the chronicle which mentions that "Rajmala" was first written in Kokborok(Tripuri).

Tulu literature

The written literature of Tulu is not as large as the literature of other literary Dravidian languages such as Tamil.[46] Nevertheless, Tulu is one of only five literary Dravidian languages, the other four being Tamil, Telugu, Kannada and Malayalam. The earliest available Tulu literature that survives to this date is the Tulu translation of the great Sanskrit epic of Mahabharata called Mahabharato (ಮಹಾಭಾರತೊ). It was written by Arunabja (1657 AD), a poet who lived in Kodavur near Udupi[47] around late 14th to early 15th century AD.[48] Other important literary works in Tulu are:

Devi Mahatmyam's (ಶ್ರೀ ದೇವಿ ಮಹಾತ್ಮೆ) 1200 AD - Tulu translation
Sri Bhagavata (ಶ್ರೀ ಭಾಗವತೊ) 1626 AD - written by Vishnu Tunga
Kaveri (1391 AD)
This script was mainly used to write religious and literary works in Sanskrit.[49][50] Even today the official script of the eight Tulu monasteries (Ashta Mathas of Udupi) founded by Madhvacharya in Udupi is Tulu.[51][52] The pontiffs of the monasteries write their names using this script when they are appointed.[52]

Modern-day Tulu literature is written using the Kannada script. Mandara Ramayana is the most notable piece of modern Tulu literature. Written by Mandara Keshava Bhatt, it received the Sahitya Academy award for best poetry.[53] Madipu, Mogaveera, Saphala and Samparka are popular Tulu periodicals published from Mangalore. The Tulu Sahitya Academy, established by the state government of Karnataka in 1994, as also the Kerala Tulu Academy established by the Indian State Government of Kerala in Manjeshwaram in 2007, are important governmental organisations that promote Tulu literature. Nevertheless, there are numerous organisations spread all over the world with significant Tulu-migrated populations that contribute to Tulu literature. Some notable contributors of Tulu literature are Kayyar Kinhanna Rai, M. K. Seetharam Kulal, Amruta Someshwara, B. A. Viveka Rai, Kedambadi Jattappa Rai, Venkataraja Puninchattaya, Paltadi Ramakrishna Achar, Dr. Sunitha M. Shetty, Dr. Vamana Nandavara, Sri. Balakrishna Shetty Polali.

Urdu literature

Among other traditions, Urdu poetry is a fine example of linguistic and cultural synthesis. Arab and Persian vocabulary based on the Hindi language resulted in a vast and extremely beloved class of ghazal literature, usually written by Muslims in contexts ranging from romance and society to philosophy and Tassawuf (Sufism). Urdu soon became the court language of the Mughals and in its higher forms was once called the "Kohinoor" of Indian languages. It is surely the most refined, enriched, sophisticated and ripended language and literature, producing poets like, Mir, Ghalib, Iqbal, Zauq and Faiz. The poetry of Mohammed Iqbal invoked a spirit of freedom among the Muslims of India, thus contributing a pivotal role in the making of Pakistan.

In Urdu literature fiction has also flourished well. Umrao Jaan Ada of Mirza Hadi Ruswa is the first significant Urdu novel. Premchand is treated as father of modern Urdu fiction with his novel Godan and short stories like Kafan. The art of short story was further taken ahead by Manto, Bedi, Krishn Chander and a host of highly acclaimed writers. Urdu novel reached further heights in the 1960s with novels of Qurratulain Haider and Abdullah Hussain. Towards the end of the 20th century Urdu novel entered into a new phase with trend setter novel MAKAAN of Paigham Afaqui. Urdu ghazal has also recently changed its colour with more and more penetration in and synchronization with modern and contemporary issues of life.

In foreign languages

Indian Persian literature

During the early Muslim period, Persian became the official language of the northern part of Indian subcontinent, used by most of the educated and the government. The language had, from its earliest days in the 11th century AD, been imported to the subcontinent by various culturally Persianised Central Asian Turkic and Afghan dynasties. Several Indians became major Persian poets later on, the most notable being Amir Khusro and, in more modern times, Muhammad Iqbal. Much of the older Sanskrit literature was also translated into Persian. For a time, it remained the court language of the Mughals, soon to be replaced by Urdu. Persian still held its status, despite the spread of Urdu, well into the early years of the British rule in India. Most British officials had to learn Persian on coming to India and concluded their conversations in Persian. In 1837, however, the British, in an effort to expand their influence, made a government ruling to discontinue the use of Persian and commence the use of English instead. Thus started the decline of Persian as most of the subcontinent's official governmental language, a position to be taken up by the new language of the British Raj, English. Many modern Indian languages still show signs of relatively heavy Persian influence, most notably Urdu and Hindi.

Literature from North East India

English literature from North East India refers to the body of work by English-language writers from North-East India.They included many sub-categories, such as Naga literature, Assamese literature, Meitei or Manipuri literature, among others. Ancient India has many intensive examples, like that of the incredible verses translated from the Ramayana, named Saptakanda Ramayana. Choral songs known as Oja-Pali, and theater performances, known as Panchali, were also an extensive part of Assamese literature.

Awards
 Sahitya Akademi Fellowship
 Jnanpith Award
 Sahitya Akademi Award
 Vyas Samman
 Saraswati Samman

See also

Indian epic poetry
List of ancient Indian writers
Indian Literature (journal)
Indian poetry
Literature from North East India
Stephanian School of Literature

Footnotes

External links

Indian Literature on Indohistory
Indian Literature, Fiction and Poetry Magazine
South Asian Canonical Texts
Bhas - Longest Poem on Indian Constitution set World Record